Qarah Hesarlu (also Romanized as Qarah Ḩeşārlū and Qareh Ḩeşārlū; also known as Ḩeşārlū) is a village in Qareh Poshtelu-e Pain Rural District, Qareh Poshtelu District, Zanjan County, Zanjan Province, Iran. At the 2006 census, its population was 93, in 21 families.

References 

Populated places in Zanjan County